The 31st Air Base, commonly known as Poznań-Krzesiny Airport is a Polish Air Force base and military airport, located in Krzesiny, part of the Nowe Miasto district of Poznań.

The base was officially constituted on 31 December 2000, and since then has been the home base for the 3rd Tactical Squadron. It is the first base to host the recently acquired F-16 fighters.

History
In 1941, during its occupation of Poznań, Nazi Germany built an aircraft factory at Krzesiny (German: Luftwaffenfliegerhorst Kreising), along with an airfield to service it.  The factory, run by Focke-Wulf, was a target for Allied bombers in the course of the war, on 29 May 1944 for Eighth Air Force. On 22 January 1945 the airfield was captured by Red Army and taken over by the Soviet Air Force, which in turn passed it to the Polish military in 1954, which has used it since, hosting various units under changing designations:
since 1954: one of squadrons of 11th Fighter Regiment (11. Pułk Lotnictwa Myśliwskiego) that was in this same year transformed to 62nd School-Training Fighter Regiment (62. Pułk Szkolno-Treningowy Lotnictwa Myśliwskiego) which was part of 3rd Air Defence Corps (3. Korpus Obrony Powietrznej)
in 1957 regiment was  renamed to 62nd Fighter Regiment (62. Pułk Lotnictwa Myśliwskiego) which, in 1958, received name of "Insurgents of Greater Poland Uprising (1918–1919)" (Powstańców Wielkopolskich 1918/1919)
on 16 January 1994 regiment was renamed to 3rd Fighter Regiment of Poznań (3. Pułk Lotnictwa Myśliwskiego "Poznań") that consists two squadrons
in 1999 1st squadron was enlarged by part of personnel and aircraft of disbanded 17th Air Force Squadron (17. Eskadra Lotnicza) from Poznań-Ławica Airport

The organisation as an air base was implemented on 31 December 2000 to conform with NATO practices, separating the air base from the units which are based there. On this date 3rd Fighter Regiment was split into 31st Air Base (31. Baza Lotnicza) and 3rd Tactical Squadron (3. Eskadra Lotnictwa Taktycznego).

On 1 April 2008 31st Air Base was again joined with 3rd Tactical Squadron and 6th Tactical Squadron to form single unit named 31st Tactical Air Base.

Confusion with Poznań–Ławica Airport
Poznań–Krzesiny Airport has been confused by pilots with Poznań–Ławica Airport, which also has a  runway. The runways are at approximately the same orientation: Ławica's is 11/29 (true heading: 108/288) and Krzesiny's is 12/30 (true heading: 117.9/297.9). The two runways lie in a nearly straight line, with Krzesiny coming up first on approaches from the east, the ones used most often. On the other hand, the Krzesiny airbase lies southeast from the city centre, while Poznań–Ławica lies just west of it. Krzesiny had a second runway, but at an unknown date this second runway that crosses runway 12/30 was closed, as in satellite images it is marked with large white X marks.

One notable incident involving confusion between Ławica and Krzesiny happened on August 15, 2006. What happened was that a Sky Airlines aircraft – a Boeing 737-800 that operated the flight SKY335 – mistook the runway at Krzesiny for the one being used in Ławica. The crew didn't realise their error until later, when they took off to reposition the jet to the main airport.

According to Krzysztof Krawcewicz, a pilot and the editor-in-chief of the Polish monthly Przegląd Lotniczy/Aviation Revue, this was at least the seventh mistaken aircraft that landed at the Poznań–Krzesiny airfield in 2006 alone. He faults, among others, the "scandalous procedures which are in use by the air traffic control at Poznań–Ławica" and the lack of radar use in controlling aircraft landing, which exists, but has been turned off by the Polish Air Traffic Agency (Agencja Ruchu Lotniczego).

References

External links

Airports in Poland
Polish Air Force bases
Soviet Air Force bases
Poland–Soviet Union relations
Buildings and structures in Poznań
Military installations of the Soviet Union in other countries